CDQ may refer to:

 Cardiff Queen Street railway station, Wales, station code
 Compact Disc Quiz, a television programme
 CDQ (rapper), Nigerian rapper
 Convert Double-word to Quad-word, an x86 instruction